The  is a skyscraper located in Shinjuku, Tokyo, Japan. The name comes from co-developers, Nihon Seimei and Sumitomo. Construction of the 134 metre, 30-story skyscraper was completed in 1982. It made an appearance in the film The Return of Godzilla (1984).

Sumitomo Realty & Development is headquartered in the building.

References

External links

  

Office buildings completed in 1982
Skyscrapers in Shinjuku
1982 establishments in Japan
Nippon Life
Postmodern architecture in Japan